Williamsburg Transportation Center is an intermodal transit station in Williamsburg, Virginia. Operated by the Williamsburg Area Transit Authority, it also serves Amtrak's Northeast Regional train as well as Greyhound Lines and Hampton Roads Transit intercity buses. The transportation center was formerly a Chesapeake and Ohio Railway (C&O) passenger station.

History 
 
In 1873, the Chesapeake and Ohio Railway (C&O) line led by Collis P. Huntington had connected Richmond with the Ohio River Valley at Huntington, West Virginia. In 1881, the Peninsula Extension of the C&O brought the line east to the new city of Newport News. Williamsburg initially allowed tracks to be placed down the main street of town, Duke of Gloucester Street, and even directly through the ruins of the historic capitol building. As regular service was established, the main line was soon relocated slightly north.

Williamsburg's original station was replaced in 1907 with a brick structure, in conjunction with the tercentenary of Jamestown. Then in 1935, the 1907 station was replaced with the present station building with funding from John D. Rockefeller Jr.

C&O passenger service to Williamsburg was replaced in 1971 by Amtrak.

Station layout
The station is served by two Amtrak trains a day in each direction, with direct service to Newport News, Richmond, and points along the Northeast Corridor from Washington DC through New York City to Boston. Intercity bus service is provided by Greyhound Lines (Carolina Trailways), Hampton Roads Transit (HRT) and the Williamsburg Area Transit Authority.

References

External links 

Williamsburg Amtrak Station (USA Rail Guide -- Train Web)

Transportation in James City County, Virginia
Transportation in York County, Virginia
Transportation in Williamsburg, Virginia
Amtrak stations in Virginia
Railway stations in the United States opened in 1935
Stations along Chesapeake and Ohio Railway lines
Transit centers in the United States
Bus stations in Virginia
Buildings and structures in Williamsburg, Virginia
1935 establishments in Virginia